Kim Jung-Sub (born October 11, 1975) is an amateur South Korean Greco-Roman wrestler, who played for the men's light heavyweight category. Kim had won three medals (gold, silver, and bronze) for his division at the Asian Games (1998 in Bangkok, 2002 in Busan, and 2006 in Doha). He also claimed two more gold medals at the 2005 Asian Wrestling Championships in Wuhan, China, and at the 2006 Asian Wrestling Championships in Almaty, Kazakhstan. Kim is a member of the wrestling team for Samsung Life Sports Club, and is coached and trained by his brother Kim In-Sub, silver medalist in the 58 kg division at the 2000 Summer Olympics in Sydney.

Kim represented South Korea at the 2008 Summer Olympics in Beijing, where he competed for the men's 84 kg class. Unfortunately, he lost the qualifying round match to Sweden's Ara Abrahamian, with a three-set technical score (1–3, 1–1, 1–1), and a classification point score of 1–3.

References

External links
Profile – International Wrestling Database
NBC 2008 Olympics profile

1975 births
Living people
Olympic wrestlers of South Korea
Wrestlers at the 1998 Asian Games
Wrestlers at the 2002 Asian Games
Wrestlers at the 2006 Asian Games
Wrestlers at the 2008 Summer Olympics
Asian Games medalists in wrestling
South Korean male sport wrestlers
Asian Games gold medalists for South Korea
Asian Games silver medalists for South Korea
Asian Games bronze medalists for South Korea
Medalists at the 1998 Asian Games
Medalists at the 2002 Asian Games
Medalists at the 2006 Asian Games
20th-century South Korean people
21st-century South Korean people